The Boys (stylized as the boys) is the second extended play by Canadian indie rock outfit, Cleopatrick. The EP was released on June 29, 2018 through the band's SoundCloud account.

Critical reception 
Matthew Waters, writing for Xune Mag described the album as "devilishly talented" and praised the accessibility, and musicianship of the EP. Waters described The Boys as a "lush set of uncomplicated rock that easy to listen to and enjoy. Cleopatrick have circumvented the hard rock theme and elevated it to something truly fantastic. Intelligent lyrics accompany a gritty rock backdrop."

Writing for CFML-FM, Hannah Gorton praised the energy of the album, but dismissed the idea of this band being rock revivalists.

Track listing

References

External links 
 
 The Boys on SoundCloud

2018 EPs
Cleopatrick EPs